Artuso is an Italian surname. Notable people with the surname include:

 Elisabetta Artuso (born 1974), Italian middle distance runner
 Alberto Artuso (born 1989), Italian footballer
 Giuseppe Artuso (born 1956), Italian rugby union player and coach

Italian-language surnames